The 7th World Championships in Athletics, a World Athletic Championships event held under the auspices of the International Association of Athletics Federations, were held at the Estadio Olímpico, Seville, Spain, between the August 20 and August 29.

One of the main highlights of the games was the world record set in the 400 metres by Michael Johnson of the United States in a time of 43.18 seconds.

Men's results

Track
1995 | 1997 | 1999 | 2001 | 2003

Note: * Indicates athletes who ran in preliminary rounds.
1 German Skurygin of Russia originally won the gold medal in the 50 km walk in 3:44:23, but was disqualified after he tested positive for drugs in November 2001. 
2 Nigeria (Innocent Asonze, Francis Obikwelu, Daniel Effiong, Deji Aliu) originally won the bronze medal in 37.91, but were disqualified on August 31, 2005 after it was found Asonze had failed a doping test in June 1999. 
3 The United States (Jerome Davis, Antonio Pettigrew, Angelo Taylor, Michael Johnson) originally won the gold medal in 2:56.45, but were disqualified in 2008 after Antonio Pettigrew admitted to using HGH and EPO between 1997 and 2003.

Field
1995 | 1997 | 1999 | 2001 | 2003

Women's results

Track
1995 | 1997 | 1999 | 2001 | 2003

Note: * Indicates athletes who ran in preliminary rounds.

Field
1995 |1997 |1999 |2001 |2003

Medal table

See also
1999 in athletics (track and field)

References
 IAAF 1999
 History of the IAAF World Championships

 
World Athletics Championships
World Championships in Athletics
Sports competitions in Seville
World Championships in Athletics
World Championships in Athletics
World Championships in Athletics
20th century in Seville